Mindy Scheier (born 1971) founded the Runway of Dreams Foundation in 2014, a fashion nonprofit for people with disabilities.

Career 
Scheier is a graduate of University of Vermont. She spent more than 20 years working as a designer for the INC collection. She also worked as a stylist for Saks Fifth Avenue in New York City.

Scheier’s son, Oliver, was born with muscular dystrophy. His requests for jeans and clothing like his peers had Shceier using her experience in fashion to modify garments to his needs- including magnetic closures, adjustable waistbands, varying pant and sleeve lengths, and more. Scheier then realized that apparel and fashion served as a significant part in building self-confidence and that every person, of all abilities, deserved to have that. That is when she established Runway of Dreams Foundation- an organization working with retailers to adapt clothing to all consumers’ needs.

In 2016, Scheier announced her first partnership with Tommy Hilfiger to design a line of adaptive clothing for the Spring collection. She has also consulted with Target, Zappos, and Nike on adapting their products for consumers with special needs.

In 2018, Scheier secured Runway of Dreams participation in New York Fashion Week. The 2019 Fashion Week included an adapted line done by Scheier and Kohl’s.

Scheier has worked with Jillian Mercado, a model who has muscular dystrophy, who starred in Diesel’s campaign and Madeline Stuart, an Australian model who has Down syndrome, who was signed by a cosmetics firm and walked in Fashion Week.

Personal life 
Scheier lives in Livingston, New Jersey with her husband Greg and three children: Stella, Oliver, and Beau.

References 

1971 births
Living people
American designers
American fashion businesspeople
American fashion designers